Chen Qi (born April 15, 1983) is a retired Chinese table tennis player. He won the gold medal in men's doubles at the 2004 Summer Olympics with Ma Lin, and is the youngest male ever to hold this title at age 20. In December 2013, Chen Qi announced his retirement and became the head coach of the Jiangsu provincial table tennis team.

Chen Qi was born in Nantong, Jiangsu, where he began to receive training at Nantong Spare-time Sports School in 1990. He became a member of the provincial team at the age of 12. Joined the No. 2 national team in 1999 and then the No. 1 national team in October 2002. Chen Qi became a member of the National Team at age 15. He is a fast attacking player and had been placed eight in the ITTF World Men's Table Tennis ranking. From March 2006 till January 2007, he was in the sixth place. From January 2004, he had been within the top ten ranks. At the 2004 ITTF Pro Tour in Kobe, Japan, Chen Qi won the singles title. He had been the runner-up at the Pro Tour events in Velenje, Slovenia, in Zagreb, Qatar, and in Kuwait City, Kuwait, all in 2006. In the Pro Tour Grand Finals, he reached the quarterfinals in 2003 in Guangzhou, China, in 2004 in Beijing, China, and in 2006 in Hong Kong. At the 2004 Volkswagen Open in Kobe, Japan, Chen Qi obtained his first ever ITTF Pro Tour Men's Singles title.

He also won the 2007 World Table Tennis Championships in men's doubles with Ma Lin. He is also a successful singles player, having been consistently ranked in the world's top 10 since 2004. Chen Qi is known as one of the few top-ranked Chinese players to play left-handed.

Chen Qi has been sponsored by Killerspin www.killerspin.com since 2007.

Style and equipment
Chen Qi's playing style is fast and aggressive normally dominating with his forehand. Chen Qi also possesses a fast backhand which is able to control the opponent which sets up his forehand. Similarly, like Ma Long he takes every opportunity to finish off rallies with his devastating forehand loop alongside his backhand drive. Although sponsored by Killerspin, Chen Qi does not use Killerspin equipment. He uses Stiga Rosewood NCT V blade Master Flared handle with special made blue sponge DHS Skyline 3 on forehand (black)(), and Tenergy 05-FX on backhand (red).

Personal life
Chen Qi is currently married and has a son.

Major achievements
 1998 National Junior Championships – 10th singles
 1999 National Junior Games – 2nd team
 2003 National Championships – 2nd team; 3rd doubles (with Ma Lin)
 2003 Korea Open – 1st doubles; 2nd singles
 2003 China Open – 1st doubles
 2003 Japan Open – 1st doubles
 2003 Malaysian Open – 8th doubles
 2003 German Open – 4th singles
 2003 Danish Open – 4th doubles
 2003 Swedish Open – 2nd singles/doubles
 2003 National Inter-city Games – 2nd singles; 3rd doubles (with Shan Mingjie)
 2003 ITTF Pro Tour Grand Finals – 1st doubles (with Ma Lin)
 2004 ITTF Pro Tour, Kobe, Japan-Gold Medal-Singles
 2004 Olympic Games – Gold Medal for men's doubles (with Ma Lin)
 2007 World Table Tennis Championship – 1st doubles (with Ma Lin)
 2008 Olympic Games – Gold Medal for men's team (as reserved player)
 2008 Killerspin SPINvitational Champion
 2009 World Table Tennis Championship – 1st doubles (with Wang Hao)
 2009 World Cup – 2nd Singles
 2009 Killerspin SPINvitational Champion
 2011 English Open – Champion

References

External links
 "Chen Qi, one of the new hopes of Chinese Men's table tennis"
 
 
 
 ITTF Database
 
 

1983 births
Living people
Chinese male table tennis players
Olympic gold medalists for China
Olympic table tennis players of China
Sportspeople from Nantong
Table tennis players at the 2004 Summer Olympics
Olympic medalists in table tennis
Asian Games medalists in table tennis
Table tennis players from Jiangsu
Medalists at the 2004 Summer Olympics
Table tennis players at the 2006 Asian Games
Medalists at the 2006 Asian Games
Asian Games gold medalists for China
Asian Games silver medalists for China
World Table Tennis Championships medalists
Nanjing Sport Institute alumni